An iron–nickel alloy or nickel–iron alloy, abbreviated FeNi or NiFe, is a group of alloys consisting primarily of the elements nickel (Ni) and iron (Fe). It is the main constituent of the "iron" planetary cores and iron meteorites. In chemistry, the acronym NiFe refers to an iron–nickel catalyst or component involved in various chemical reactions, or the reactions themselves; in geology, it refers to the main constituents of telluric planetary cores (including Earth's).

Some manufactured alloys of iron–nickel are called nickel steel or stainless steel. Depending on the intended use of the alloy, these are usually fortified with small amounts of other metals, such as chromium, cobalt, molybdenum, and titanium.

Astronomy and geology
Iron and nickel are the most abundant elements produced during the final stage of stellar nucleosynthesis in massive stars. Heavier elements require other forms of nucleosynthesis, such as during a supernova or neutron star merger. Iron and nickel are the most abundant metals in metallic meteorites and in the dense metal cores of telluric planets, such as Earth.

Nickel–iron alloys occur naturally on Earth's surface as telluric iron or meteoric iron.

Chemistry and metallurgy
The affinity of nickel atoms (atomic number 28) for iron (atomic number 26) results in natural occurring alloys and a large number of commercial alloys. The surfaces of these metallic compounds provide a complex electron environment for catalyzing chemical reactions.

In steel metallurgy, nickel is alloyed with iron to produce maraging steel and some low-alloy steels. Other technological uses include Invar and Mu-metal.

Alloy summary
The following table is an overview of different iron–nickel alloys. Naturally occurring alloys are a type of mineral and called native elements or native metals. Some of the entries have more than one crystal structure (e.g. meteoric iron is a mixture of two crystal structures).

See also

 Iron–nickel clusters
 KREEP
 Sial
 Sima

References
 

Petrology
Structure of the Earth
Ferrous alloys
Meteorites